who also uses the name Shimiken (しみけん) is a male adult video (AV) actor from Japan. He is credited with having sex with over 10,000 women in the course of making 10,000 films.

Life and career
Shimizu was born on September 1, 1979 and made his first appearance as a gravure model at 18 years old in the July 1998 issue of the Japanese gay men's magazine Buddy (Badi). His AV career began shortly afterward and by mid-2002 he was reported to have appeared in over 1200 adult videos.

Shimizu makes homosexual adult movies and is a popular figure in the gay community. He and Yoshiya Minami appeared together in a May 2003 video from V&R Planning, Ecstasy: Venture (ECSTASY ～危険な香り～), with actresses Hitomi Shina and Mariko Kawana, but in an unusual twist for Japanese porn, the video box cover featured Shimizu and Minami, not the actresses, and seems pointed toward a female (or gay) audience. In an even more male-oriented project from November 2007 produced by Force Entertainment, CYBER EXSTASY, he appeared in an anthology along with Japanese AV actor Natsuya Togawa. The video took excerpts from the actors' heterosexual videos but dwells on the male body.

Another possible example of the Japanese AV industry's new interest in women viewers is shown in the 2008 Adult Video Grandprix contest where Shimizu's video Shimiken's Private 7 FUCK (しみけんのプライベート7FUCK) won the Best Miscellaneous Video award. The December 2007 video, produced by IdeaPocket and prominently displaying Shimizu clad only in briefs on the cover presents him having sex with seven AV Idols, Chihiro Hara, Mangetsu Sakuragawa, Nene, Kaede Akina, Natsuki Sugisaki, Yua Aida and Marin. A second volume in the series, Shimiken's Private 7 FUCK 2 (しみけんのプライベート7FUCK 2), which also portrays his physique on the video box front cover, was released in August 2008.

References

1979 births
Living people
Japanese male pornographic film actors
Actors in gay pornographic films
Japanese bodybuilders
Actors from Chiba Prefecture